Daniel Pulteney (c. 1684 – 7 September 1731) was an English government official and politician who sat in the House of Commons from 1721 to 1731.

Biography

Pulteney was the son of John Pulteney (d. 1726), MP for Hastings and Commissioner of Customs, and Lucy Colville. He studied at Christ Church, Oxford, matriculating in 1699.

He was one of the Commissioners for Trade and Plantations between July 1717 and October 1721. He entered Parliament in March 1721 as Member of Parliament for Tregony in Cornwall. In September he was appointed a Lord of the Admiralty, a post which he held until 1725. He was also later appointed Clerk of the Council in Ireland.

At the general election of 1722, Pulteney was elected for two constituencies, Hedon (the Yorkshire borough owned by his cousin William Pulteney, who was its other MP) and Preston, which he chose to represent. He sat as Preston's MP for the remaining nine years of his life. Although a Whig, he detested Robert Walpole. At first he was enthusiastic supporter of Sunderland, having married his wife's sister; after Sunderland's fall he was one of the early members of the Patriot Whigs (of which William Pulteney quickly became the central figure).

He married Margaret Tichborne (c. 1699–1763), daughter of Benjamin Tichborne, on 14 December 1717. Their three sons all died in childhood. His youngest daughter, Frances, who married William Johnstone, inherited the vast Pulteney fortune from Daniel's cousins, at which her husband changed his name to Pulteney.

Daniel Pulteney died on 7 September 1731 at Harefield in Middlesex and was buried in Westminster Abbey.

References

 Henry Stooks Smith, "The Parliaments of England from 1715 to 1847" (2nd edition, edited by FWS Craig - Chichester: Parliamentary Reference Publications, 1973)
 Basil Williams, The Whig Supremacy 1714-1760 (2nd edition, Oxford University Press, 1962)
 Concise Dictionary of National Biography (Oxford University Press, 1930)
 
 British History Online

1680s births
1731 deaths
British MPs 1715–1722
British MPs 1722–1727
British MPs 1727–1734
Members of the Parliament of Great Britain for English constituencies
Members of the Parliament of Great Britain for constituencies in Cornwall
Whig (British political party) MPs
Lords of the Admiralty
Burials at Westminster Abbey
Ambassadors of Great Britain to Denmark